WDPN-TV (channel 2) is a television station licensed to Wilmington, Delaware, United States, serving the Philadelphia area as an affiliate of the classic television network MeTV. It is owned by Maranatha Broadcasting Company alongside Allentown, Pennsylvania–licensed independent station WFMZ-TV (channel 69). Both stations share studios on East Rock Road on South Mountain in Allentown, while WDPN's transmitter is located at the antenna farm in the Roxborough section of Philadelphia.

History

Origins in Wyoming
WDPN-TV's origins lie in a construction permit granted to Ambassador Media in 1988 for a Jackson, Wyoming, satellite station of its ABC affiliate in Pocatello, Idaho, KPVI. The new station, which signed on January 9, 1991, as KJVI, served as a semi-satellite of KPVI for the Wyoming side of the Idaho Falls–Pocatello market, airing separate commercials. KPVI and KJVI were sold to Sunbelt Communications Company in November 1995, who switched the stations to NBC in January 1996. Channel 2's call letters were changed to KJWY that June. While KJWY was technically a satellite of KPVI, it later began to carry Wyoming news from another Sunbelt-owned NBC affiliate, KCWY in Casper, after that station began a news operation.

KJWY had the distinction of being the lowest-powered full-service analog television station in the United States, at only 178 watts. It also tied CJBN-TV channel 13 of Kenora, Ontario, Canada, also at 178 watts, for the lowest-powered full-service analog station in North America. The analog channel 2 signal traveled a very long distance under normal conditions, and KJWY had to operate at very low power since it was short-spaced to KBCI-TV in Boise, Idaho (now KBOI-TV), and KUTV in Salt Lake City. After the digital transition was complete, KJWY's power was increased to 270 watts, equivalent to 1,350 watts in analog—still fairly modest for a full-power station.

On March 2, 2009, Sunbelt Communications Company filed an application with the FCC to sell KJWY to PMCM TV (whose principals own six Jersey Shore radio stations in Monmouth and Ocean counties as Press Communications, LLC); however, Sunbelt initially planned to retain control of KJWY under a local marketing agreement. The transaction was approved by the FCC on June 10, 2009, after both parties agreed to drop the proposed local marketing agreement. After closing the sale on June 12, 2009, KJWY dropped all NBC programming, as well as the KPVI simulcast. After two months off-the-air, KJWY returned on August 12 as a This TV affiliate. It switched to MeTV in 2012.

Move to Delaware
Soon after taking over, PMCM sought permission to reallocate KJWY from Jackson, Wyoming to Wilmington, Delaware as part of a legal loophole that allows any VHF station that moves to a state with no FCC-licensed commercial VHF stations to receive automatic permission to move. Delaware had not had any commercial VHF stations licensed within its borders since WVUE in Wilmington—whose frequency is now occupied by Philadelphia PBS member WHYY-TV—had gone off the air in 1958. (PMCM also looked to move KVNV to New Jersey under the same rule.) The request was denied by the FCC in a December 18, 2009, letter. The full Commission denied PMCM's application for review in a Memorandum Opinion and Order released on September 15, 2011; however, this denial was reversed by the U.S. Court of Appeals for the D.C. Circuit on December 14, 2012. On March 8, 2013, the call letters were changed to KJWP, making it one of the few stations east of the Mississippi River with a "K" call sign. KJWP applied for a construction permit to move to Wilmington (though its transmitter is in Philadelphia's Roxborough neighborhood where the transmitters for most Philadelphia television stations are located) on May 28, 2013. KJWP signed off from Jackson for the last time on August 11, 2013, in anticipation of the move. (Following the move, the station's former studios on West Broadway in Jackson were permanently closed.) On November 18, 2013, KJWP signed on its upconverted 720p high-definition television signal from its new location at Roxborough. The station continued to carry MeTV following the move, and on February 27, 2014, KJWP launched in the Philadelphia and New Jersey area. On March 1, 2014, KJWP fully became the Delaware Valley's exclusive MeTV affiliate, with Allentown, Pennsylvania-based WFMZ-TV (channel 69) discontinuing their MeTV subchannel the same day. After the move to Wilmington, the station's power drastically increased to 9.36 kW, adjusting itself to the size of the Philadelphia television market.

In late June 2014, the station announced the hiring of longtime Philadelphia television personality Larry Mendte as public affairs director. Mendte hosted two programs for the station; The Delaware Way, a week-in-review rundown of state issues, and ...And Another Thing, a more general news and commentary program (the latter also airs on sister station WJLP in the New York City area).

On December 17, 2015, PMCM TV agreed to sell KJWP to Allentown-based Maranatha Broadcasting Company (owner of WFMZ-TV) for an undisclosed price. The deal was finalized nearly two years later, on August 31, 2017, creating a duopoly in the Philadelphia market with WFMZ, with the two stations serving different parts of the market. 

On September 4, 2018, KJWP's call letters were changed to WDPN-TV.

Programming
As of January 2022, WDPN carries the majority of the MeTV lineup, with some exceptions. The 302, a public affairs show focused on the Delaware area, airs on Saturdays at 6a.m. and Sundays at 7a.m. WDPN also preempts several hours of the MeTV schedule each day to air infomercials from 5 to 7 a.m. on weekdays and Saturdays, and 6 to 8 a.m. on Sundays.

Technical information

Subchannels
WDPN-TV's broadcast signal is multiplexed, with its lead channel (2.1) airing programming from MeTV. On August 18, 2014, KJWP added subchannels that carry Escape (2.2) and Grit (2.3), new networks that respectively cater to female and male audiences. In February 2015, Justice Network (2.4) made its debut as part of the KJWP broadcast featuring true crime and police-centric programming (Justice has since moved to a subchannel of Univision-owned WUVP-DT).

References

External links

RabbitEars.info for WDPN-TV WILMINGTON, DE by Facility ID 1283
RabbitEars.info for market Philadelphia, PA
TV Fool website (local TV signals, distance, direction and strength)

MeTV affiliates
Grit (TV network) affiliates
Ion Mystery affiliates
Heroes & Icons affiliates
Retro TV affiliates
Decades (TV network) affiliates
Story Television affiliates
Television channels and stations established in 1991
1991 establishments in Wyoming
DPN-TV